The British Rail Class 802 is a type of high-speed bi-mode multiple-unit passenger train designed and produced by the Japanese manufacturer Hitachi Rail. It has been operated by Great Western Railway, TransPennine Express, and Hull Trains; each of these train operating companies has given its own units a unique brand: Great Western Railway's units are branded Intercity Express Trains (IETs), TransPennine Express units are branded Nova 1s and Hull Trains' units are branded Paragons.

The Class 802 is based on the design of the Hitachi A-train, being a member of the Hitachi AT300 product family. It is broadly similar to the preceding Class 800, the primary difference between the two being the installation of more powerful diesel engines and enlarged fuel tanks on the Class 802 to mitigate for their intended use on lengthier unelectrified stretches of railway. Their introduction by the Great Western Railway facilitated the replacement of ageing Intercity 125 high-speed trains, and enabled a reduction of journey times.

Various enhancement and modification schemes have been both implemented and proposed. Both Great Western Railway and TransPennine Express have agreed to participate in trials of battery train technology that, dependent on results, may see fleetwide adoption. In the event of large-scale electrification being funded and implemented during the train's service life, it is practical for some of the engines to be removed from Class 802 sets if rendered surplus, which would reduce their overall weight by 15% and thus raise operational efficiency. Furthermore, while the Class 802s presently have an initial maximum speed of 125 mph, if infrastructure upgrades were to permit greater speeds at a future date, they have the capability of being modified for operating at 140 mph.

History

During mid-2015, the train operator Great Western Railway (GWR) announced that it had arranged to procure 173 new rail vehicles from Hitachi Rail, along with options for an additional 150. At the time, GWR was in the early stages of introducing a new fleet of intercity trains as part of the Department for Transport's Intercity Express Programme.

This project involved the procurement of both wholly electric units (Class 801), and "bi-mode" trains (Class 800), powered by electric traction motors capable of running from overhead electric wires or on-board diesel generators. These trains were intended to replace the existing High Speed Trains following the electrification of the Great Western Main Line. However, electrification will only go as far as Cardiff Central, while the route beyond Cardiff continued to require diesel traction (hence the need to procure trains capable of operating without overhead wires).

The purchase of 173 additional vehicles was with the intention that these new bi-mode trains, similar to the Class 800s, would be used on services into Devon and Cornwall. These trains would consist of 22 five-car and 7 nine-car units. The option for a further 150 vehicles would be formed into another 30 five-car units.

Initially, because Hitachi's Manufacturing Facility  at Newton Aycliffe in County Durham was at capacity, the intention was to build the trains at the Kasado factory in Kudamatsu in Japan. However, following Hitachi's purchase of the Italian train manufacturer AnsaldoBreda, construction was moved to Hitachi's newly-acquired Pistoia plant, from which the first unit was reportedly completed in February 2018.

The trains were scheduled to enter service with GWR from 2018. One of the stated aims of the procurement was the reduction of journey times, such as between London and Exeter by up to five minutes, London and Plymouth by up to six minutes, and London and Penzance by up to 14 minutes.

Operations
The Class 802s are broadly the same as the  bi-mode trains produced for the Intercity Express Programme, and have been operated in a similar manner; they are run as electric trains wherever possible, and are equipped with the identical diesel generator units as to those on the Class 800.

Great Western Railway

During 2017, GWR took delivery of 36 sets; a further 22 five-car and 14 nine-car sets arrived in the following year. This was an increase from the 29 sets that had been initially ordered in 2015. In August 2017, main-line testing of the Class 802 commenced in Somerset. They were due to be introduced on 16 July 2018. On 17 August 2018, a demonstration run for invited guests from Penzance to Exeter St Davids was conducted.

During the following day, the first two units (802 006 and 802 007) entered traffic, conducting a Bristol Temple Meads to Swansea service. By May 2019, all 36 of the sets had entered service, which allowed them to finish replacing the remaining InterCity 125 sets, alongside the Class 800 units. 

In December 2020, it was announced that Hitachi and the Eversholt Rail Group would replace one under-floor diesel engine on each of the 22 five-car 802/0 sets with a battery, converting the units to a tri-mode multiple unit. As a result, pollution and noise levels will be reduced and fuel savings of up to 20% are expected to be achieved. In April 2022, new sidings in Penzance to better facilitate the operation of GWR's nine-car Class 802 sets to Cornwall were announced.

Hull Trains

During November 2016, the open-access operator Hull Trains announced the signing of a £60m deal to procure five five-car AT300 sets, which it would to replace its existing fleet of Alstom-built Class 180 diesel multiple units on its Hull to London service. The first Class 802 body shell was completed at the Kasado plant in August 2018. During August 2019, the company's drivers commenced training using trains already delivered to TransPennine Express. In the same month, Hull Trains announced that its new train would be known as the Paragon, named after .

On 7 November 2019, Hull Trains took delivery of its first Class 802 set (802301). This unit participated in the official launch of the Paragon fleet on 25 November, at which the full livery was unveiled at Hull station. On 5 December 2019, the first Class 802 officially entered service, working the 10:33 Hull to London King's Cross along with the 13:48 return.

Following the introduction of the Class 802 units, the surplus Class 180 units were transferred in stages to East Midlands Railway to replace EMR's three six-carriage HSTs inherited from Grand Central. Hull Trains have configured their Class 802s so that Coach A contains standard seating with wheelchair accommodation, Coach B and Coach C are both standard seating, Coach D is both standard- and first-class seating and Coach E is completely first-class seating with wheelchair accommodation. As a reported result of customer requests, the Class 802s do not have a cafe bar, unlike their Class 180 predecessors.

TransPennine Express

In March 2016, the train operator First TransPennine Express announced the awarding of a contract to Hitachi Rail Europe and leasing company Angel Trains for the supply of 19 five-car Class 802 sets, which would be primarily operated on the North Transpennine route between Liverpool, Manchester, Leeds, Newcastle and Edinburgh. It had been ordered as one part of ambitious plans to bolster route capacity by 80%. According to Robin Davis, TPE's Head of New Trains, a major rationale behind the Nova 1 fleet was its bi-mode capability, noting that electrification ambitions often had much uncertainty, while a bi-mode fleet eliminated the operational risk to such uncertainty.

While these trains were initially given the Class 803 designation, they were officially redesignated as 802/2s prior to the delivery of the first unit. During December 2017, it was announced that production of the first unit for the operator had begun. In July 2018, testing of the type commenced on the East Coast Main Line. TransPennine Express has branded its new overall fleet Nova, each of the new types being designated either '1', '2' or '3' - the Class 802s being called Nova 1.

During July 2019, TransPennine Express formally accepted the first of its Class 802 trainset. As per the original schedule, the fleet was due to enter service from summer 2019. On 28 September 2019, the first Nova 1 entered revenue-earning service; unit 802201 worked the 06:03 from Newcastle to Liverpool Lime Street as well as the return 09:25 service. Clearance for the service had only been received the evening beforehand. Regular scheduled working commenced shortly thereafter.

During October 2021, it was announced that TransPennine Express, Hitachi, and Angel Trains had agreed to convert one of the former's Nova 1 trainsets into a battery hybrid train on a trial basis with the aim of supporting the technology's further development. If successful, Hitachi and Angel Trains have proposed the retrofitting of the entire fleet. In January 2022, reports emerged that the Nova 1 fleet was operating under diesel power even when operating on entirely electrified sections of the East Coast Main Line on account of the insufficient power supplies present along the line; national railway infrastructure owner Network Rail is reportedly set to complete upgrades to the power supplies within two years.

The fleet is also set to benefit from the rollout of electrification under the Transpennine route upgrade scheme. The company's management has noted that, in the event of largescale electrification being funded and implemented, the Class 802s could have some of their engines removed to reduce roughly 15% of their weight and thus raise their efficiency.

Fleet details

Named trains

Great Western Railway

Great Western Railway's Intercity Express Trains are being named after "inspirational people" who have influenced the regions that the company serves.

Hull Trains

TransPennine Express

Liveries

Incidents
 On 14 September 2018, the 14:00 GWR Penzance to Paddington service broke down at 17:15, just north of Exeter. Passengers had to be removed from the train with ladders and transferred to another train.
This damage led to service cancellations and delays that night and the following two days.
 On 22 March 2022, a TransPennine Express unit, 802207, derailed at the Heaton depot, near Newcastle upon Tyne.

References

External links

High-speed trains of the United Kingdom
Hitachi multiple units
Hybrid multiple units
Train-related introductions in 2018
25 kV AC multiple units